How to Marry a Billionaire: A Christmas Tale is a 2000 American Christmas romantic comedy television film directed by Rod Daniel, starring John Stamos, Joshua Malina, and Shemar Moore. It is a remake of the 1953 film How to Marry a Millionaire and premiered on Fox on December 20, 2000.

Premise
Three friends, disillusioned with their romantic lives, plot to marry millionaires before Christmas day. In the course, however, they find love each one in his own way.

Cast
 John Stamos as Tom Nathan
 Joshua Malina as Mark Sickler
 Shemar Moore as Jason Hunt
 Gabrielle Anwar as Jenny Seeger
 Dorie Barton as Tiffany Kennedy
 Carole Raphaelle Davis as Catherine
 Rhea Perlman as Jacqueline Kennedy
 Dabney Coleman as John F. Kennedy

Reception
Steven Oxman from Variety magazine wrote: "Despite attractive trappings and some distinctly delightful cameos, Fox's How to Marry a Billionaire ultimately comes off as a wooden effort Fox's take on the original 1953 pic replaces the three women out to marry into money with three men out to accomplish the same—and adds extra zeroes to the titular target. But while the argument presented in the pic—what's good for the goose should be good for the gander (if women can marry for money, why not men?)—makes perfect sense, this story remains an idea that never quite works, resulting in a joyless, if intermittently amusing, made-for."

See also
 List of Christmas films

References

External links
 
 

2000 television films
2000 films
2000 romantic comedy films
2000s Christmas comedy films
American Christmas comedy films
Remakes of American films
American romantic comedy films
Christmas television films
Comedy film remakes
American comedy television films
Films directed by Rod Daniel
Films scored by Teddy Castellucci
Films shot in California
Fox network original films
Romance film remakes
Romance television films
Television remakes of films
2000s American films